Ahane is a small townland approximately  west/northwest of Brosna village in County Kerry. It is close to the border with County Limerick. The area consists mostly of dairy farms. As of the 2011 census, it had a population of 32 people in 11 houses.

References

Townlands of County Kerry